S303 may refer to :
 HNoMS Utvær (S303), a Royal Norwegian Navy Ula class submarine
 Victorian Railways S class (diesel) locomotive